Gonodes is a genus of moths of the family Noctuidae. The genus was erected by Herbert Druce in 1908.

Species
 Gonodes albifascia Hampson, 1918
 Gonodes albifissa H. Druce, 1908
 Gonodes aroensis (Schaus, 1904)
 Gonodes cuneata Dyar, 1914
 Gonodes densissima Dyar, 1914
 Gonodes dianiphea E. D. Jones, 1908
 Gonodes echion Schaus, 1914
 Gonodes lilla E. D. Jones, 1914
 Gonodes liquida (Möschler, 1886)
 Gonodes netopha Schaus, 1911
 Gonodes obliqua H. Druce, 1909
 Gonodes pallida E. D. Jones, 1914
 Gonodes trapezoides (Herrich-Schäffer, 1868)

References

Hadeninae